Süreyya Akın Akınözü (born 22 September 1990) is a Turkish actor known for playing Miran Aslanbey in the Turkish TV series Hercai. He is the son of the actress Özlem Akınözü.

Early life

Akın Akınözü was born on 23 September 1990, in Ankara, Turkey and is the only child of actress Özlem Akınözü and restaurant owner Tamer Akınözü. His maternal grandfather, Süreyya Arın was one of the first TV presenters on TRT (Turkish Radio and Television). His great-uncle Süha Arın is known as "The Father of Turkish Documentaries". Akınözü attended Ankara TED High School and subsequently studied mathematics at the University of California, Berkeley, where he lived for around 6 years before deciding to become an actor.

Career
Akınözü's performance as Miran in Hercai has earned him awards such as: "Best Actor in a Dramatic Series" (24th Golden Lens Awards of the Magazine Journalists Association 2019), and "Best Couple in a TV series", which he shares with Hercai co-star Ebru Şahin (Ayaklı Newspaper Awards 2020). He was also awarded the Spanish television station Nova Atresmedia's Premio Nova Mas's Best Male Actor in 2019 and Mister Nova 2019. As of 2021, he shares the lead roles with Öykü Karayel and Sarp Apak in the Star TV drama 'Kaderimin Oyunu'.

Filmography

Awards and nominations

References

Turkish male television actors
Male actors from Ankara
1990 births
Living people